Jordan D. Olsen (born 27 April 1990) is a New Zealand born Canadian rugby union player. His position is hooker. He is the captain of the team and has also represented Canada A at international level. He qualifies for Canada through his mother who is Canadian.

References

External links
itsrugby.co.uk profile

Canadian rugby union players
1990 births
Living people
Northland rugby union players
Rugby union hookers